WQST was a radio station licensed to serve Forest, Mississippi.  The station is owned by Ace Broadcasting, Inc. Its format was southern gospel. The station was assigned this callsign by the Federal Communications Commission  September 1, 1986.

On Sunday, March 16, 2008, WQST dropped its simulcast with WZQK for southern gospel from The Gospel Station, based in Ada, Oklahoma.

In December 2012 WQST left the air due to financial reasons, and surrendered its license to the FCC on January 10, 2013.  It is now internet only.

References

External links
WQST AM 850

QST
Radio stations established in 1986
1986 establishments in Mississippi
Radio stations disestablished in 2013
Defunct radio stations in the United States
QST
Defunct religious radio stations in the United States
Internet radio stations in the United States
2013 disestablishments in Mississippi
QST